Cork Racecourse, also known as Cork Racecourse Mallow, is a horse racing venue at Mallow, County Cork, Ireland which stages both National Hunt racing and Flat racing. It is located 35 km north of Cork and 64 km from  Limerick

The course is right handed, one and a half miles round and has a straight sprint course of five furlongs. In 2017 work commenced on an extension to the straight course which will make it one of only two seven furlongs straights in Ireland.

The course was opened in 1924 and was originally known as Mallow Racecourse. It is close to Buttevant and Doneraile, where the first steeplechase was supposedly run in 1752.

Notable races

References

External links
Official website

 
Horse racing venues in the Republic of Ireland
Sports venues in County Cork
Mallow, County Cork
Sports venues completed in 1924
1924 establishments in Ireland